64th General Assembly of Nova Scotia is the assembly of the Nova Scotia House of Assembly that was determined in the 2021 Nova Scotia election. The assembly opened on September 24, 2021.

List of members

Seating Plan

Current as of October 2022

Membership changes in the 64th Assembly

References

64
General Assembly, 64
Nova Scotia General Assembly, 64